Pradeep Shakthi  (25 July 1954 – 20 February 2016) was an Indian Telugu actor, director and businessman.

Pradeep Shakthi, born as Raja Vasireddy, was from the Guntur district of Andhra Pradesh. He was introduced to Telugu cinema by director Vamsy in the film Aalaapana (1985). He acted in many Telugu and Tamil films in negative roles. He directed a politically controversial film, 1990 Kaliyuga Viswamithra (1989). He migrated to the US in 1993 and settled in Staten Island, New York, where he became a full-time restaurateur.

Filmography

Actor
 Telugu

 Pantulamma (1977)
Maa Bhoomi(1979)
 Aalaapana (1985)
 Ladies Tailor (1985)
 Lawyer Suhasini (1987)
 Bazaar Rowdy (1988)
 Janaki Ramudu (1988)
 Aakhari Poratam (1988)
 Raktha Tilakam (1988)
 Two Town Rowdy (1989)
 Donga Kollu (1988)
 Marana Mrudangam (1988)
 Indrudu Chandrudu (1989)
 Chettu Kinda Pleader (1989)
 Simha Swapnam (1989)
 Prema (1989)
 Vinta Dongalu (1989)
 Rajakeeya Chadarangam (1989)
 Koduku Diddina Kapuram (1989)
 Ashoka Chakravarthy (1989)
 Bobbili Raja (1990)
 Chinnari Muddula Papa (1990)
 Neti Siddhartha (1990)
 Aggiramudu (1990)
 April 1 Vidudala (1991)
 Shri Edukondalu Swamy (1991) as Shani
 Chitram Bhalare Vichitram (1992)
 Brahma (1992)
 Chakravyuham (1992)
 Parugo Parugu (1994)
 Anna (1994)
 Chintakayala Ravi (2008)
 Gopi Gopika Godavari (2009)
 Chinna Cinema (2013)
 Subramanyam for Sale (2015)

Tamil

 Nayakan  (1987)
 Jeeva (1988)
 Kaliyugam (1988)
 Sathya (1988)
 Pen Puthi Mun Puthi (1988)
 Rajadhi Raja (1989)
 Aadi Velli (1990)
 Idhaya Thamarai  (1990)
 Maruthu Pandi (1990)
 Michael Madana Kama Rajan (1990)
 Bramma (1991)
 Gunaa (1991)
 Thalapathi (1991)
 Meera (1992)
 Valli (1993)
 Madurai Meenakshi (1993)

Malayalam
 Chamaram

Hindi
 Khatron Ke Khiladi (1988)

Kannada
 Lockup Death (1994)

Director
 Kaliyuga Vishwamitra (1989)

References

External links

Telugu male actors
Male actors in Telugu cinema
Male actors in Tamil cinema
Telugu film directors
People from Guntur district
1954 births
2016 deaths
Male actors from Andhra Pradesh
Film directors from Andhra Pradesh
20th-century Indian film directors
20th-century Indian male actors
Indian male film actors